Tonegawa may refer to:

History
 Battle of Tonegawa, a Japanese battle

Science
 Susumu Tonegawa (born 1939), Japanese scientist
 6927 Tonegawa (1994 TE1), a minor planet discovered on October 2, 1994 Kitami Observatory, Japan

Other
 Tone River (利根川 Tone-gawa), a river in the Kantō region of Japan
 Yukio Tonegawa, a character in the Japanese manga series, Kaiji

Japanese-language surnames